Frank Waters (1902–1995) was an American writer.

Frank Waters may also refer to:

Frank Waters (actor) (1915–1972), Australian actor
Frank Waters (politician) (1907–1990), member of the Queensland Legislative Assembly
Frank Waters (rugby union) (1908–1954), Scottish rugby player 
Muddy Waters (American football) (1923–2006), American football player and couch

See also
Frank "Muddy" Waters Stadium
Frank Watters  (1934–2020), Australian gellerist and artist